Richard W. Hanselman (October 8, 1927 - October 1, 2021) was an American businessman. He served as the chief executive officer of Genesco from 1981 to 1986, and as its chairman from 1984 to 1986. He died in Nashville, Tennessee.

References

1927 births
2021 deaths
Dartmouth College alumni
American chief executives
American chairpersons of corporations
Genesco people
Businesspeople from Cincinnati